The 2015 Drake Bulldogs football team represented Drake University as a member of the Pioneer Football League (PFL) during 2015 NCAA Division I FCS football season. Led by second-year head coach Rick Fox, the Bulldogs compiled an overall record of 5–6 with a mark of 4–4 in conference play, placing in a three-way tie for fourth in the PFL. The team played its home games at Drake Stadium in Des Moines, Iowa.

Schedule

Game summaries

William Jewell

@ North Dakota

@ South Dakota

Stetson

@ Campbell

Valparaiso

@ San Diego

Jacksonville

@ Morehead State

@ Butler

Dayton

References

Drake
Drake Bulldogs football seasons
Drake Bulldogs football